Late Night Tales: Nils Frahm is a mix album compiled by German composer Nils Frahm, released on 11 September 2015.

It is a part of the Late Night Tales series of albums released by Night Time Stories.

Track listing 

2015 compilation albums
Nils Frahm
Nils Frahm albums